The SFCA Lignel 161 was a French trainer aircraft built in the late 1930s.

Specifications

References

SFCA aircraft
Trainer aircraft
Single-engined tractor aircraft
Low-wing aircraft
Aircraft first flown in 1938